The 32nd Tank Regiment is a tank regiment of the Italian Army based in Tauriano in Friuli Venezia Giulia. Originally the regiment, like all Italian tank units, was part of the infantry, but since 1 June 1999 it is part of the cavalry. Operationally the regiment is assigned to the 132nd Armored Brigade "Ariete".

History

Formation 
The regiment was formed on 15 September 1936 in Verona as 2nd Tank Infantry Regiment with four battalions: IV, V, and XI assault tanks battalions and the III Breach Tanks Battalion. The assault tanks battalions fielded L3/35 tankettes, while the breach tanks battalion fielded Fiat 3000 light tanks. Its structure at its foundation was as follows: 

 2nd Tank Infantry Regiment, in Verona
 IV Assault Tanks Battalion "Monti", in Bolzano (L3/35 tankettes) 
 V Assault Tanks Battalion "Venezian", in Trieste (L3/35 tankettes)
 XI Assault Tanks Battalion "Gregorutti", in Udine (L3/35 tankettes)
 III Breach Tanks Battalion, in Verona (Fiat 3000 light tanks)
 2nd Tank Training Center, in Verona
 2nd Tank Materiel Maintenance Workshop, in Verona

The regiment was renamed 32nd Tank Infantry Regiment on 1 December 1938 and received the IV Breach Tanks Battalion in Vercelli from the 1st Tank Infantry Regiment. On the day of the 32nd regiment's founding, it and the 8th Bersaglieri Regiment entered the II Armored Brigade in Milan, which had been formed on 15 July 1937 with the 3rd Bersaglieri Regiment. On 1 February 1939 the brigade was dissolved and the 32nd Tank Infantry Regiment, 8th Bersaglieri Regiment and newly raised 132nd Armored Artillery Regiment entered the newly raised 132nd Armored Division "Ariete". On the same date the regiment received the II Assault Tanks Battalion "Berardi" from the 1st Tank Infantry Regiment. During the same year the regiment also received the CCCXI Breach Tanks Battalion (former I Breach Tanks Battalion) from the 31st Tank Infantry Regiment and the CCCXXIII Breach Tanks Battalion (former V Breach Tanks Battalion) from the 1st Tank Infantry Regiment, while ceding the V Assault Tanks Battalion "Venezian" to the 3rd Tank Infantry Regiment. The regiment then began the process of forming new medium tank battalions with the personnel of the breach tank battalions. In April 1940 battalions were renamed and the regiment entered World War II with the following structure:

 32nd Tank Infantry Regiment, in Verona
 I Tank Battalion "L" (L3/35 tankettes, former II Assault Tanks Battalion "Berardi")
 II Tank Battalion "L" (L3/35 tankettes, former IV Assault Tanks Battalion "Monti")
 III Tank Battalion "L" (L3/35 tankettes, former XI Assault Tanks Battalion "Gregorutti")
 I Tank Battalion "M" (M11/39 tanks, former III (CCCXXI) Breach Tanks Battalion)
 II Tank Battalion "M" (M11/39 tanks, former IV (CCCXXII) Breach Tanks Battalion)
 III Tank Battalion "M" (M13/40 tanks, former V (CCCXXIII) Breach Tanks Battalion)
 IV Tank Battalion "M" (M13/40 tanks, former I (CCCXI) Breach Tanks Battalion)
 V Tank Battalion "M" (M13/40 tanks, raised 11 November 1940)

World War II 

After Italy's entry into World War II on 10 June 1940 the 32nd regiment ceded some of its units to other regiments: the I and II tank battalions M were ceded on 11 June to the 4th Tank Infantry Regiment for transfer to Libya for the planned invasion of Egypt. The IV Tank Battalion "M" was ceded to the 31st Tank Infantry Regiment based in Albania to bolster it for the upcoming invasion of Greece, and during fall 1940 the III and V tank battalions "M" were deployed to Libya, with the III arriving in September and the V arriving in November 1940. The two battalions fielded 37 M13/40 tanks each and entered the Special Armored Brigade of General Valentino Babini. 

On the day the British offensive Operation Compass began the II Tank Battalion "M" was destroyed during the British Attack on Nibeiwa. Most tank battalion "L" were destroyed during the Battle of Bardia, while the I Tank Battalion "M" was annihilated during the British capture of Tobruk. The III, V, VI, XXI tank battalions M clashed with the 7th British Armoured Division in the action at Mechili. The end for the units of the Italian 10th Army came on 6–7 February 1941 when their retreat was blocked by the 7th British Armoured Division at Beda Fomm and the furious and futile attempts of the tank battalions to open a breach in the British line during the Battle of Beda Fomm came to naught. With 7 February 1941 the 10th Army with all its units and all the reinforcements sent to it had been destroyed or captured by the British XIII Corps.

For its sacrifice the III Tank Battalion M was awarded a Gold Medal of Military Valour, which is nowadays attached to the 32nd Tank Regiment's flag and displayed on the regiment's coat of arms. The V Tank Battalion M was awarded a Silver Medal of Military Valour, which is attached to the flag of the suspended 5th Tank Battalion "M.O. Chiamenti".

On 22 January, the day Tobruk fell, the 32nd Tank Infantry Regiment, together with the entire 132nd Armored Division "Ariete", embarked in Naples and sailed for Tripoli in Libya where the division arrived on 24 January, the day British spearheads engaged the last Italian units in Cyrenaica. After arriving in Libya the regiment was in no shape to contrast the British advance as it consisted of the I, II, and III tank battalions "L" with useless L3 tankettes.

The first useful M13/40 tanks arrived on 11 March with the VII Tank Battalion "M" with, which the 32nd regiment's depot in Verona had raised. Followed by the VIII Tank Battalion "M" formed by the 4th Tank Infantry Regiment, and later on 21 July 1941 by the IX Tank Battalion "M" formed by the 3rd Tank Infantry Regiment.

The regiment participated in the Erwin Rommel's Operation Sonnenblume and the following Siege of Tobruk. As the regiment's L3/35 tankettes were useless Ariete division commander General Ettore Baldassarre demanded repeatedly to be sent M13/40 tanks to re-equip the regiment's three "L" battalions or be sent "M" tank battalions. Ultimately the High Command in Rome settled on a plan to repatriate the men of the 32nd and retrain them at the 32nd's depot in Verona. Therefore the 4th Tank Infantry Regiment raised a new command company, which was transferred to Libya on 1 June 1941 and gave birth to the 132nd Tank Infantry Regiment on 1 September 1941 and in October the XIII Tank Battalion "M", raised by the 32nd regiment's depot in Verona, was transferred to the 31st Tank Infantry Regiment instead of being sent to Africa. After its activation the 132nd regiment received the three "M" battalions of its sister regiment, whose return to Italy was repeatedly postponed, until both regiments were heavily invested and decimated during the British Operation Crusader, fighting battles at Bir el Gubi on 19 November and 4-7 December and for Point 175 before retreating West.
 
As the Ariete division had lost 76% of its men during Operation Crusader the 32nd regiment was taken out of the front on 31 December 1941 and sent to the rear. On 8 January 1942, the 32nd was disbanded and its personnel used to bring the 132nd regiment partially back up to strength. The flag of the regiment was then transferred to Verona, where the regiment was activated again in May of the same year.

In September 1942 the regimental command and the XVI Tank Battalion "M" it had raised moved to Sanluri in Sardinia to take command of the armored units on the island. The regiment had now the following structure:

 32nd Tank Infantry Regiment, in Sanluri
 XVI Tank Battalion "M" (1x company M14/41 tanks and 1x company Semovente 75/18 self-propelled guns)
 XVIII Tank Battalion "M" (1x company M15/42 tanks and 1x company Semovente 75/18 self-propelled guns, raised by the 3rd Tank Infantry Regiment, arrived 27 June 1943)
 CC Tank Battalion "S35" (captured French SOMUA S35 tanks, raised by the 131st Tank Infantry Regiment, arrived 25 December 1941)
 I Tank Battalion "L" (L3/35 tankettes, former XIII Assault Tanks Battalion "Sardegna", placed in reserve status and ceded to the 132nd Tank Infantry Regiment on 21 March 1944)
 2x armored car companies

On 15 May 1944 the Infantry Division "Granatieri di Sardegna" was raised again in Sardinia and the 32nd and 132nd tank infantry regiments joined the division, which remained static on the island. On 2 October 1944, the 32nd regiment was disbanded without having seen combat. The 132nd regiment has already been disbanded on 27 August and the Grantieri division on 31 August.

Cold War 
On 1 March 1964 the regiment was reformed in Cordenons as 32nd Tank Regiment and joined the Armored Division "Ariete". The regiment consisted of the III and V tank battalions, and the XXIII Bersaglieri Battalion. In 1968 the regiment moved to Tauriano.

3rd Tank Battalion "M.O. Galas" 

During the 1975 army reform the 32nd Tank Regiment was disbanded on 30 September 1975 and its III Tank Battalion became the 3rd Tank Battalion "M.O. Galas", while the V Tank Battalion became the 5th Tank Battalion "M.O. Chiamenti", and its XXIII Bersaglieri Battalion became the 23rd Bersaglieri Battalion "Castel di Borgo". The flag and traditions of the disbanded regiment were assigned to the 3rd Tank Battalion "M.O. Galas". Tank and armored battalions created during the 1975 army reform were all named for officers, soldiers and partisans, who were posthumously awarded Italy's highest military honor the Gold Medal of Military Valour for heroism during World War II. The 3rd Tank Battalion's name commemorated 32nd Tank Infantry Regiment Sergeant Bruno Galas, who had fought with the III Tank Battalion in North Africa and was killed in action on 3 January 1941 during the Battle of Bardia. Equipped with M60A1 Patton main battle tanks the battalion joined the Armored Brigade "Mameli", whose headquarters had been formed from the 32nd Tank Regiment's headquarters.

For its conduct and work after the 1976 Friuli earthquake the battalion was awarded a Silver Medal of Army Valour, which was affixed to the battalion's flag and added to the battalion's coat of arms.

5th Tank Battalion "M.O. Chiamenti" 

The 5th Tank Battalion "M.O. Chiamenti" was formed during the 1975 army reform by renaming the V Tank Battalion of the 32nd Tank Regiment. The 5th Chiamenti was granted a new flag.

Recent times 
After the end of the Cold War the Italian Army began to draw down its forces and the "Mameli" was the first brigade disband. On 1 April 1991, the brigade was deactivated along with some of its subordinate units, while the 3rd and 5th tank battalions, and 23rd Bersaglieri Battalion joined the 132nd Armored Brigade "Ariete". On 25 August 1992 the 5th Tank Battalion "M.O. Chiamenti" disbanded and its personnel entered the "Galas" battalion, which entered the reformed 32nd Tank Regiment the next day.

From 29 December 1992 to 15 March 1994 the regiment participated with some of its companies in the international Unified Task Force and UNOSOM II missions in Somalia. During this mission on 3 July 1993 the regiment fought in the Battle at Checkpoint Pasta, where for the first time since World War II Italian tanks opened fire at enemy forces. For its conduct and service in Somalia the regiment was awarded a Bronze Medal of Army Valour, which was affixed to the regiment's flag and added to the regiment's coat of arms.

Current structure 
As of 2022 the 32nd Tank Regiment consists of:

  Regimental Command, in Tauriano
 Command and Logistic Support Company "Balbia"
 3rd Tank Battalion "M.O. Galas"
 1st Tank Company "Leoni di Bardia" (13x Ariete AMV main battle tanks)
 2nd Tank Company "El Mechili" (13x Ariete AMV main battle tanks)
 3rd Tank Company "Beda Fomm" (13x Ariete AMV main battle tanks)
 4th Tank Company "Tobruk" (Disbanded)
 5th Tank Company "Ghemines" (Disbanded)

The Command and Logistic Support Company fields the following platoons: C3 Platoon, Transport and Materiel Platoon, Medical Platoon, and Commissariat Platoon. In total the regiment fields 41x Ariete AMV main battle tanks: 13x per company, plus one for the battalion commander and one for the regiment commander.

See also 
 132nd Armored Brigade "Ariete"

Further reading

External links
Italian Army Website: 32° Reggimento Carri

References

Tank Regiments of Italy